Kelly Krauskopf is an American basketball executive. She is the former director of operations of Women's National Basketball Association (WNBA). Krauskopf is the former president and general manager of the Indiana Fever. She helped build the Indiana Fever franchise and led the team to WNBA playoffs thirteen times; the Fever took three conference titles and won the WNBA championship in 2012.

On December 17, 2018, the Indiana Pacers announced that she was hired as the Pacer's assistant general manager. She started in her new position in 2019.

Career

College basketball 
Krauskopf played basketball collegiately during the 1980s. She played forward under coach Sue Gunter at Stephen F. Austin and became a three-year letterwinner under coach Cherri Rapp at Texas A&M where she was a senior team captain.

Assistant commissioner and director of operations 
In 1990, Krauskopf joined the Southwest Conference and served as assistant commissioner. In 1996, she became the WNBA's first director of operations upon the league's inception. She said that was a turning point in her career: "To be part of a historical startup pro league for women under the guidance and support of the NBA was an extraordinary opportunity."

Indiana Fever 
Krauskopf joined Pacers Sports & Entertainment in 1999. She served as president and general manager of the Indiana Fever from 2000 to 2017; she was promoted to president in 2012. She led the Fever to eight consecutive playoff appearances and 13 appearances in total. During her tenure the team won three conference titles and a WNBA championship in 2012. In 2017, she left the Fever to oversee the Pacer's eSports team in NBA 2K League.

Women's national team 
Krauskopf had a significant role in selecting rosters for the three gold-winning United States women's national basketball teams that won in the 2004, 2008, and 2012 Summer Olympics.

Indiana Pacers 
On December 17, 2018, the Indiana Pacers announced that Krauskopf was hired as the Pacer's assistant general manager and she would leave her executive duties at the Fever and the Pacer's eSports team. She started in her new position on January 1, 2019. Krauskopf said her previous professional experiences have taught her "that building winning teams and elite level culture is not based on gender", and instead "it is based on people and processes". She would work with President of Basketball Operations Kevin Pritchard, General Manager Chad Buchanan and Assistant General Manager Peter Dinwiddie.

When Krauskopf was hired, it was reported that she was the first female assistant general manager in National Basketball Association's history. Many pointed out that Nancy Leonard, the wife of Bobby Leonard, had held the same title during the 1970s. David Benner, Indiana Pacers director of media relations, said Leonard's role was "strictly on the business side of things" and Krauskopf is the first general manager in the contemporaneous meaning of "general manager". Pritchard said that Krauskopf would focus strictly on basketball and she would "not have any duties on the business side".

Personal life 
Krauskopf was born and grew up in Corpus Christi, Texas. In 1983, she graduated from Texas A&M.

References

External links 

 Kelly Krauskopf on Twitter
 Interview with subject at ESPN
 Interview with subject  at ESPN

Indiana Pacers executives
Living people
National Basketball Association executives
Sportspeople from Corpus Christi, Texas
Stephen F. Austin Ladyjacks basketball players
Women's National Basketball Association executives
Year of birth missing (living people)
Women's National Basketball Association general managers